Christina Pluhar (Graz, 1965) is an Austrian theorbist, harpist, conductor, and director of L'Arpeggiata ensemble.

After studies at the University of Graz, Christina Pluhar recognised her passion for ancient music. From then on, she devoted herself to playing the lute, theorbo and baroque guitar. She gained her knowledge at the Royal Conservatory of The Hague and at the Schola Cantorum Basiliensis. Her teachers included Toyohiko Satoh, Eugen Dombois, Hopkinson Smith, Paul O'Dette, Pat O'Brian and Jesper Bøje Christensen. She learned to play the baroque Arpa Doppia at the Scuola Civica di Milano with Mara Galassi.

In 1992, as a member of the Ensemble La Fenice, she received the first prize at the Festival of Early Music in Malmö. Since then she has been living in Paris and performing as a soloist and as a basso continuo player in the baroque scene. With her ensemble L'Arpeggiata, founded in 2000, she plays at international festivals and makes recordings.

In addition to her activities as a musician and ensemble director, Christina Pluhar has been teaching baroque harp at the Royal Conservatory of The Hague since 1999 and gives master classes at the University of Graz.

Discography

Albums
 2004: Landi: homo fugit velut umbra
 2004: Al Improvviso: Ciaconne, Bergamasche et un po' di folie
 2004: Kapsberger: La Villanella
 2004: La Tarantella: antidotum tarantulae
 2005: Cavalieri: rappresentatione di anima et di corpo
 2007: Los Impossibles
 2009: Monteverdi: Teatro d'Amore
 2010: Via Crucis
 2011: Vespro della Beata Vergine
 2012: Los Pajaros Perdidos
 2013: Mediterraneo
 2014: Music for a While
 2015: Cavalli: L'amore innamorato
 2016: Orfeo Chamán
 2017: Händel Goes Wild
 2018: Himmelsmusik
 2021: Alla Napoletana
 2023: Passacalle de la Follie
 References

1965 births
Living people
Theorbists
Women conductors (music)
20th-century Austrian conductors (music)
21st-century Austrian conductors (music)
Musicians from Graz
University of Graz alumni
20th-century women musicians
21st-century women musicians
Women performers of early music
Musicians from Paris
Erato Records artists